5000 series may refer to several types of trains:

Chicago train type
 5000 series (CTA)

Japanese train types 
 Chichibu Railway 5000 series EMU
 Chikuho Electric Railroad 5000 series electric multiple unit operated on the Chikuhō Electric Railroad Line
 Fujikyu 5000 series EMU
 Ichibata Electric Railway 5000 series EMU 
 JR Shikoku 5000 series EMU
 Kantō Railway KiHa 5000 series DMU, in service since 2009 on the Jōsō Line
 Keio 5000 series EMU, in service from 1963 until 1996
 Keio 5000 series (2nd generation) EMU, in service from 2017
 Kobe Municipal Subway 5000 series EMU operated on the Kaigan Line
 Meitetsu 5000 series (1955) EMU, in service from 1955 until 1986
 Meitetsu 5000 series (2008) EMU, in service since 2008
 Nagoya Municipal Subway 5000 series EMU
 Odakyu 5000 series (1969) EMU, in service from 1969 until 2012
 Odakyu 5000 series (2019) EMU, in service since 2020
 Sanyo 5000 series EMU
 Sapporo Municipal Subway 5000 series subway cars
 Seibu 5000 series EMU
 Shinetsu 5000 series EMU operated on the Kobe Electric Railway
 Shonan Monorail 5000 series monorail
 Sotetsu 5000 series EMU
 Tobu 5000 series EMU
 Tokyo Metro 5000 series EMU
 Tokyu 5000 series EMU

Korean train types  
 Seoul Metro 5000 series

Other 
 Dell Inspiron 5000 series laptop computers
 Radeon HD 5000 series graphics processing units made by Radeon

See also

 Toei Class E5000 electric locomotive
 5000 (disambiguation)